Air launch to orbit (ALTO) is the method of launching smaller rockets at altitude from a heavier conventional horizontal-takeoff 
aircraft, to carry satellites to low Earth orbit. It is a follow-on development of air launches of experimental aircraft that began in the late 1940s. This method, when employed for orbital payload insertion, presents significant advantages over conventional vertical rocket launches, particularly because of the reduced mass, thrust, cost of the rocket, geographical factors and natural disasters.

Air launching has also been developed for sub-orbital spaceflight. In 2004 the Ansari X Prize $10 Million purse was won by a team led by Burt Rutan's Scaled Composites, launching the SpaceShipOne from the purpose-built White Knight carrier aircraft.

Advantages
The principal advantage of a rocket being launched by a high flying airplane is that it need not fly through the low, dense atmosphere, the drag of which requires a considerable amount of extra work and thus mass of propellant. Higher densities at lower altitudes result in larger drag forces acting on the vehicle. In addition, thrust is lost due to over-expansion of the exhaust at high ambient pressure and under-expansion at low ambient pressure; a fixed nozzle geometry cannot provide optimal exhaust expansion over the full range of ambient pressure, and represents a compromise solution. Rockets launched from high altitude can be optimized for lower ambient pressure, thus achieving greater thrust over the entire operating regime.

Propellant is conserved because the air-breathing carrier aircraft lifts the rocket to altitude much more efficiently. Airplane engines do not require on-board storage of an oxidizer and they can use the surrounding air to produce thrust, for example with a turbofan. This allows the launch system to conserve a significant amount of mass that would otherwise be reserved for fuel, reducing the overall size. A larger fraction of the rocket mass can then include payload, reducing payload launch costs.

Air launch to orbit offers the potential for aircraft-like operations such as launch on demand, and is also less subject to launch-constraining weather. This allows the aircraft to fly around weather conditions as well as fly to better launch points, and to launch a payload into any orbital inclination at any time. Insurance costs are reduced as well, because launches occur well away from land, and there is no need for a launch pad or blockhouse.

Air launch to orbit also works well as part of a combination launch system such as a reusable air-launched single stage to skyhook launch vehicle powered by a rocket or rocket/ramjet/scramjet engine.

An additional benefit of air launch to orbit is a reduced delta V needed to achieve orbit. This results in a greater payload to fuel ratio which reduces the cost per unit mass to orbit. To further leverage the Delta V advantage, supersonic air launch to orbit has been proposed.

Air launch to orbit also served as alternative if conditions do not allow launching a rocket vertically from ground to orbit due to certain reasons, such as natural disasters (earthquakes, tsunamis, floods and volcanic eruptions).

Disadvantages
According to Aviation Week and Space Technology, air launch to orbit is limited by aircraft size. Additionally, airplanes may generate large lateral forces which could damage payloads.

SpaceX CEO Elon Musk argued in a Q&A session at the Royal Aeronautical Society that the increase in performance is not worth the additional complexity and limitations:
"…it seems like...you're high up there and so surely that's good and you're going at...0.7 or 0.8 Mach and you've got some speed and altitude, you can use a higher expansion ratio on the nozzle, doesn't all that add up to a meaningful improvement in payload to orbit? The answer is no, it does not, unfortunately. It's quite a small improvement. It's maybe a 5% improvement in payload to orbit...and then you've got this humungous plane to deal with. Which is just like having a stage. From SpaceX's standpoint, would it make more sense to have a gigantic plane or to increase the size of the first stage by five percent? Uhh, I'll take option two. And then, once you get beyond a certain scale, you just can't make the plane big enough. When you drop...the rocket, you have the slight problem that you're not going the right direction. If you look at what Orbital Sciences did with Pegasus, they have a delta wing to do the turn maneuver but then you've got this big wing that's added a bunch of mass and you've able to mostly, but not entirely, convert your horizontal velocity into vertical velocity, or mostly vertical velocity, and the net is really not great."

Air launch systems

Operational:
 Northrop Grumman Innovation Systems (originally Orbital Sciences, then Orbital ATK, since 2018 Northrop) Pegasus
Virgin Orbit LauncherOne
Retired:

 NOTS-EV-1 Pilot

Under development:
 Stratolaunch
 CubeCab  
  ARCASPACE
 Generation Orbit Launch Services - contracted for NASA NEXT  
 NASA Armstrong Flight Research Center Towed Glider Air-Launch System
 CDTI, CNES, DLR Aldebaran (rocket)
 Antonov, Aerospace Industry Corporation of China Antonov An-225 Mriya
Orbit Boy microsatellite air-launch system

Proposed:
 Vulcan Aerospace 75-percent-scaled Dream Chaser crew-carrying spaceplane with rocket by Orbital Sciences
  (proposed by Ukraine)
  (proposed by Ukraine)

Abandoned projects:
 DARPA  ALASA
 AirLaunch LLC
 MAKS
 Ishim
 
 Orbital Sciences Pegasus II – contracted design/build for Stratolaunch Systems 
 Swiss Space Systems SOAR
 XCOR Aerospace Lynx Mark III
 Falcon 9 Air Developed 2011-2012, In partnership between SpaceX and Stratolaunch systems

See also
 NOTS-EV-1 Pilot
 NOTS-EV-2 Caleb
 Buoyant space port
 Rockoon
 Launch vehicle types by launch platform
 Black Horse (rocket)
 Rocketplane XS

References

External links

 A Study of Air Launch Methods for RLVs (AIAA 2001-4619)
 Low Cost Launch of Payloads to Low Earth Orbit 
Illini Space Jet

 
Rocketry
Space access